Ramón Espinar may refer to:

Ramón Espinar Gallego (born 1954), Spanish politician (PSOE)
Ramón Espinar Merino (born 1986), son of the above, Spanish politician (Podemos)